Charles de Marguetel de Saint-Denis, seigneur de Saint-Évremond (1 April 16139 September 1703) was a French soldier, hedonist, essayist and literary critic. After 1661, he lived in exile, mainly in England, as a consequence of his attack on French policy at the time of the Peace of the Pyrenees (1659). He is buried in Poets' Corner, Westminster. He wrote for his friends and did not intend his work to be published, although a few of his pieces were leaked in his lifetime. The first full collection of his works was published in London in 1705, after his death.

Life
He was born at Saint-Denis-le-Guast, near Coutances, the seat of his family in Normandy. He was a pupil of the Jesuits at the College de Clermont (now Lycée Louis-le-Grand), Paris; then a student at Caen. For a time he studied law in Paris at the College d'Harcourt (now Lycée Saint-Louis). He soon, however, took to arms, and in 1629 went with Marshal Bassompierre to Italy. He served through a great part of the Thirty Years' War, distinguishing himself at the siege of Landrecies (1637), when he was made captain. During his campaigns he studied the works of Montaigne and the Spanish and Italian languages.

In 1639 he met Gassendi in Paris, and became one of his disciples. He was present at the battles of Rocroi, Nördlingen, and at Lerida. For a time he was personally attached to Condé, but offended him by a satirical remark and was deprived of his command in the prince's guards in 1648. During the Fronde, Saint-Évremond was a steady royalist. The Duke of Candale, of whom Saint-Évremond has left a very severe portrait,  gave him a command in Guienne after he had reached the grade of maréchal de camp, and he is said to have pocketed 50,000 livres in less than three years from this office. He was one of the numerous victims involved in the fall of Fouquet in 1661. His letter to Marshal Créquy on the Treaty of the Pyrenees, which is said to have been discovered by Colbert's agents at the seizure of Fouquet's papers, seems a very inadequate cause for his disgrace.

Saint-Évremond fled to the Netherlands and to England, where he was kindly received by Charles II and was pensioned. After James II's flight to France, Saint-Évremond was invited to return, but he declined. Hortense Mancini, the most attractive of Cardinal Mazarin's group of attractive nieces, came to England in 1670, and set up a salon for flirtation, gambling, and witty conversation, and here Saint-Évremond was for many years at home. He died aged ninety on 9 September 1703 and was buried in Westminster Abbey, where his monument is in Poets' Corner, close to that of Prior.

Literary work

Saint-Évremond never authorised the printing of any of his works during his lifetime, though Barbin in 1668 published an unauthorised collection but he empowered Pierre des Maizeaux to publish his works after his death, and they were published in London (2 vols., 1705), and often reprinted. His masterpiece in irony is the so-called Conversation du maréchal d'Hocquincourt avec le père Canaye (the latter a Jesuit and Saint-Évremond's master at school), which has been frequently classed with the Lettres provinciales.

His Œuvres meslées, edited from the manuscripts by Silvestre and Maizeaux, were printed by Jacob Tonson (London, 1705, 2 vols.; 2nd ed., 3 vols., 1709), with a notice by Maizeaux. His correspondence with Ninon de l'Enclos, whose fast friend he was, was published in 1752; La Comédie des académistes, written in 1643, was printed in 1650. Modern editions of his works are by Hippeau (Paris, 1852), C. Giraud (Paris, 1865), and a selection (1881) with a notice by M. de Lescure. Among his plays is one called Politick Would-be, modelled on a character from Ben Jonson's Volpone.

Partial bibliography
 Œuvres mêlées (1643–1692),
 Les Académistes (1650)
 Retraite de M. le duc de Longueville en Normandie
 Lettre au marquis de Créqui sur la paix des Pyrénées (1659)
 Conversation du maréchal d’Hocquincourt avec le Père Canaye
 Réflexions sur les divers génies du peuple romain (1663)
 Seconde partie des œuvres meslées (1668),
 Sur nos comédies
 De quelques livres espagnols, italiens et français
 Réflexions sur la tragédie ancienne et moderne
 Défense de quelques pièces de Corneille
 Parallèle de M. le Prince et de M. de Turenne
 Discours sur Épicure
 Pensées sur l’honnêteté
 Considérations sur Hannibal
 
 L’idée de la femme qui ne se trouve point
 
 Dissertation sur la tragédie d’Alexandre
 Fragment d’une lettre écrite de La Haye
 De la seconde guerre punique
 De l’éloquence, tirée de Pétrone
 La matrone d’Éphèse

Publications
 Les Opéra, Éd. Robert Finch et Eugène Joliat, Genève, Droz, 1979.
 Œuvres en prose, Éd. René Ternois, Paris, Didier, 1962.
 La Comédie des académistes, Éd. Louis d'Espinay Ételan, Paolo Carile et al., Paris, Nizet, 1976.
 Entretiens sur toutes choses, Éd. David Bensoussan, Paris, Desjonquères, 1998. 
 Écrits philosophiques, Éd. Jean-Pierre Jackson, Paris, Alive, 1996. 
 Réflexions sur les divers génies du peuple romain dans les divers temps de la république, Napoli, Jovene, 1982.
 Conversations et autres écrits philosophiques, Paris, Aveline, 1926.
 Lettres, Éd. intro. René Ternois, Paris, Didier, 1967.
 Maximes et œuvres diverses, Paris, Éditions du Monde Moderne, 1900–1965.
 Pensées d’Épicure précédées d'un Essai sur la morale d’Épicure, Paris, Payot 1900.

References

Further reading

Online
 http://frenchphilosophes.weebly.com/saint-evremond.html
 Discours sur Épicure. Paris: Claude Barbin, 1684.
 Œuvres meslées de M. D. *** de S. Évremont. Paris: Claude Barbin, 1693.
 Œuvres meslées Tome I. Paris: Claude Barbin, 1670.
 Œuvres meslées Tome II. Paris: Claude Barbin, 1671.
 Œuvres meslées Tome III. missing.
 Œuvres meslées Tome IV. Paris: Claude Barbin, 1681.
Œuvres meslées Tome V. Paris, Claude Barbin, 1678.
 Œuvres meslées Tome VI. Paris: Claude Barbin, [1683].
 Œuvres meslées Tome VII. Paris: Claude Barbin, 1684.
 Œuvres meslées Tome VIII. Paris: Claude Barbin, 1684.
 Œuvres meslées Tome IX. Paris: Claude Barbin, 1684.
 Œuvres meslées Tome X. Paris: Claude Barbin, 1684.
 Œuvres meslées Tome XI. Paris: Claude Barbin, 1684.
 Les Académiciens : comédie. Paris: Charavay frères, 1879.

Print
 Antoine Adam, Les libertins au XVIIe, Paris, Buchet/Chastel 1964
 Patrick Andrivet, Saint-Évremond et l'histoire romaine, Orléans, Paradigme, 1998 
 H.T. Barnwell, Les idées morales et critiques de Saint-Évremond : essai d'analyse explicative, Paris, PUF, 1957
 Patrice Bouysse, Essai sur la jeunesse d'un moraliste : Saint-Évremond (1614–1661), Seattle, Papers on French Seventeenth Century Literature, 1987
 Gustave Cohen, Le séjour de Saint-Évremond en Hollande, Paris, Champion, 1926
 Walter Daniels, Melville Saint-Évremond en Angleterre, Versailles, L. Luce, 1907
 Soûad Guellouz, Entre baroque et lumières : Saint-Évremond (1614–1703) : colloque de Cerisy-la-Salle (25–27 septembre 1998), Caen : Presses universitaires de Caen, 2000 
 Suzanne Guellouz, Saint-Évremond au miroir du temps : actes du colloque du tricentenaire de sa mort, Caen – Saint-Lô (9-11 octobre 2003), Tübingen, Narr, 2005 
 Célestin Hippeau, Les écrivains normands au XVIIe : Du Perron, Malherbe, Bois-Robert, Sarasin, P. Du Bosc, Saint-Évremond, Genève, Slatkine Reprints, 1970
 Mario Paul Lafargue, Saint-Évremond ; ou, Le Pétrone du XVIIe, Paris, Société d'éditions extérieures et coloniales, 1945
 Gustave Merlet Saint-Évremond : étude historique morale et littéraire; suivie de fragments en vers et en prose, Paris, A. Sauton, 1870
 Luigi de Nardis, Il cortegiano e l’eroe, studio su Saint-Évremond, Firenze, La Nuova Italia Editrice, 1964
 Léon Petit, La Fontaine et Évremond : ou, La tentation de l'Angleterre, Toulouse, Privat, 1953
 Jacques Prévot, Libertins du XVIIe, v. 2, Paris, Gallimard, 1998–2004 
 Gottlob Reinhardt, Saint-Évremonds Urteile und Gedanken üer die alten Griechen und Römer, Saalfeld am Saale, 1900
 Leonard Rosmarin, Saint-Évremond : artiste de l'euphorie, Birmingham, Summa Publications, 1987 
 Albert-Marie Schmidt, Saint-Évremond ; ou, L'humaniste impur, Paris, Éditions du Cavalier, 1932
 K. Spalatin, Saint-Évremond, Zagreb, Thèse de doctorat de l’Université de Zagreb, 1934
 Claude Taittinger, Saint-Évremond, ou, Le bon usage des plaisirs, Paris, Perrin, 1990 

1610 births
1703 deaths
People from Manche
Lycée Louis-le-Grand alumni
Lycée Saint-Louis alumni
French military leaders
French literary critics
17th-century French writers
17th-century French male writers
18th-century French writers
18th-century French male writers
Burials at Westminster Abbey
French male essayists
18th-century essayists